The Democratic Memory Law is a  law in Spain which came into effect in 2022, concerning the legacy of  Francoist Spain.

Background 
After Franco's death in 1975, the Spanish transition to democracy saw the birth of the Pact of Forgetting, where both leftist and rightist parties of Spain decided to avoid confronting directly the legacy of Francoism. Because of the Pact, there were no prosecutions for persons responsible for human rights violations or similar crimes committed during the Francoist period, Francoist public memorials remained standing, and the Francoist "Day of Victory" celebration was changed to "Armed Forces Day," celebrating both Nationalist and Republican parties of the Civil War.

In 2007, the Spanish government passed the Historical Memory Law, formally condemning the repressions of the Franco Regime and giving certain rights to the victims and the descendants of victims of the Civil War and the subsequent dictatorship. However, the law attracted criticism, with some on the left arguing that it does not go far enough and with the conservative Popular Party arguing that it was "using the Civil War as an argument for political propaganda."

On 18 June 2018, Sánchez' government announced its intention to remove the remains of former dictator Francisco Franco from the Valle de los Caídos. On 24 August 2018, Sánchez's cabinet approved a decree that modifies two aspects of the 2007 Historical Memory Law to allow the exhumation of Franco's remains from the Valle de los Caídos. After a year of legal battles with Franco's descendants, the exhumation took place on 24 October 2019, and Franco was reburied at Mingorrubio Cemetery in El Pardo with his wife Carmen Polo.

Summary 
In 2020, the government of Pedro Sanchez announced its intentions to introduce a new law to address the legacy of Francoism - the Democratic Memory Law. On 15 September 2020, the cabinet approved a draft bill to be presented to parliament. The law passed the upper house of parliament on 5 October 2022, and came into effect on 21 October 2022.

The bill includes a provision to ensure secondary school, Spanish Baccalaureate, and vocational training students are taught about the dictatorship. The bill would also declare the tens of thousands of convictions for military rebellion against Franco from 1936 to 1938 void, but bars those targeted by the illegitimate convictions from suing the government for compensation.

As well, the law would render the government responsible for exhuming and identifying the bodies of those murdered by the fascist regime and buried in unmarked graves. It would create an official register of victims to connect currently scattered information about the victims and would include the possibility of DNA testing to help locate surviving relatives. The law would also redefine the Valley of the Fallen monument as a national cemetery for people killed on both sides of the civil war, with no remains to be placed in a place of particular prominence.

The law also intends to finally remove a number of remaining Francoist symbols from the country, including the possibility of issuing fines of €200 to €150,000 for those who promote fascist symbols or attempt to humiliate the victims of fascism. It would also abolish the nobility titles awarded by the fascist regime and would dissolve the Francisco Franco National Foundation.

The law  offered Spanish citizenship to the children of Spanish exiles who had fled from the Franco regime. The 2007 Historical Memory Law had excluded children of exiles who had changed or renounced their Spanish citizenship; the new law entitled any descendant of Spanish immigrants born before 1985 – the year Spain changed its nationality law – to citizenship. This now included the grandchildren of people exiled under the Franco dictatorship, and the descendants of women who had lost their citizenship on marrying non-Spaniards. It is estimated that 700,000 people could be eligible for citizenship under the new "grandchildren law".

Some confusion was caused after deputy PM Pablo Iglesias tweeted that "the descendants of the members of the International Brigades who fought for freedom and against fascism in Spain will be eligible for Spanish nationality," but the draft bill only included posthumous citizenship for the veterans of the International Brigades. Jim Jump, chair of the International Brigade Memorial Trust said that, as all the anti-fascist veterans were now deceased, the provision was "a welcome gesture" but "mainly symbolic."

Reception 
PSOE politician and Secretary-General of the Office of the Prime Minister of Spain Félix Bolaños argued that it was "the first law to repudiate the coup of 1936" and that "No democratic force should have any problems paying tribute to the victims of a dictatorship." Far-right party Vox, however, has pledged to repeal the law if they gain power in the next Spanish general election, due to be held at the latest in December 2023. The right-wing People's Party leader Pablo Casado also pledged to repeal the law, stating that all it did was "dig up grudges."

See also 
 Memory laws

References 

Politics of Spain